The following is an episode list for the Australian television show H2O: Just Add Water, which first aired on Network Ten in Australia and has since been broadcast in more than 120 countries worldwide. Series one premiered in Australia on 7 July 2006 and series two began there on 28 September 2007. The third series premiered in the United Kingdom on 26 October 2009 while its Australian premiere occurred on 22 May 2010.

Series overview 

{| class="wikitable plainrowheaders" style="text-align:center;"
|-
! scope="col" colspan="2" rowspan="2" style="padding: 0px 8px" |Series
! scope="col" rowspan="2" style="padding: 0px 8px" |Episodes
! scope="col" colspan="2" style="padding: 1px 8px" |Originally aired
|-
! scope="col" style="padding: 1px 8px" | Series premiere
! scope="col" style="padding: 1px 8px" | Series finale
|-
| scope="row" bgcolor="#004FC5" height="10px"| 
| [[List of H2O: Just Add Water episodes#Series one (2006)|1]]
| 26
| 
| 
|-
| scope="row" bgcolor="#00AAFF" height="10px"| 
| [[List of H2O: Just Add Water episodes#Series two (2007–08)|2]]
| 26
| 
| 
|-
| scope="row" bgcolor="#00FFFF" height="10px"| 
| [[List of H2O: Just Add Water episodes#Series three (2009–10)|3]]
| 26
|  (UK)
|  (UK)
|}

Episodes

Series one (2006) 
Emma Gilbert (Claire Holt), Cleo Sertori (Phoebe Tonkin) and Rikki Chadwick (Cariba Heine) are three teenage girls who become stranded on the mysterious Mako Island. When they enter an underground pool of water that leads to the ocean they find themselves bathed in the glow of moonlight from overhead. After being rescued the girls return to their normal lives but soon discover they have changed: seconds after contact with water they transform into mermaids. After further experimentation, they discover they also have unique supernatural powers over water. Emma can freeze water, Cleo can control the shape and volume of water, and Rikki can boil water. The girls enlist Cleo's long-time friend Lewis McCartney (Angus McLaren) to try to determine why this has happened to them and help them keep their new identity a secret. The series focuses on the girls dealing with everyday teen problems while trying to cope with their newfound abilities.

The first series features a single primary storyline with three main elements. The girls meet Louise Chatham (Christine Amor), an older woman who reveals that she too was once a mermaid. She helps the girls understand their own situation and warns them of the dangers involved. After a confrontation with Ms. Chatham, Zane Bennett (Burgess Abernethy) gets trapped on her sinking houseboat which forces Emma to rush to his aid. During the rescue, Zane catches a glimpse of her tail and becomes obsessed with finding this "sea monster". Doctor Denman (Lara Cox), a marine biologist, also becomes focused on the mermaids when Lewis accidentally leaves behind a genetic sample of the girls he was working on in her lab. Zane later helps her to capture the girls, unaware of their true identities. When he realises what he has done, Zane works with Lewis to free the girls who trick the scientists into believing they have given up their powers during a lunar eclipse. In reality, they were only temporarily removed of their powers.

Series two (2007–08) 
A full moon, in conjunction with a rare planetary alignment, calls the girls to the moon pool at Mako Island where their powers are greatly augmented and strengthened. The second series revolves around the arrival of a new girl, Charlotte Watsford (Brittany Byrnes), who moves into the area and develops an instant attraction to Lewis. After Charlotte sees a film of her grandmother Gracie as a mermaid she meets Max Hamilton (Martin Vaughan) who was once romantically involved with Gracie. Happy to have met his lover's granddaughter, he tells her about the previous mermaids—Louise, Julia, and Gracie—and of Mako Island. Charlotte travels to the moon pool during a full moon and becomes the fourth mermaid in possession of all the girls' powers. Believing herself superior, she and the girls become sworn enemies. This conflict results in a confrontation during an especially powerful full moon, which ends with Charlotte being permanently stripped of her mermaid form and abilities.

Series two also focuses on the romantic entanglements of the girls. Cleo breaks up with Lewis for being too clingy and protective after which he dates Charlotte. Rikki and Zane start dating again after breaking up during the series one finale. Emma meets Ash (Craig Horner) and flirts with him but he is frustrated by the secrets she constantly holds back. She eventually relents and tells him that she is a mermaid. Torn because of the conflict between his friends and Charlotte, Lewis comes to the conclusion that his loyalties lie with the girls and with Cleo in particular. He breaks up with Charlotte and begins dating Cleo again.

Series three (2009–10) 

The third series begins with Cleo and Rikki dealing with the loss of Emma who is travelling the world with her family. New characters are introduced including Bella Hartley (Indiana Evans), a singer and mermaid since the age of nine with the power to turn water into gelatine; and Will Benjamin (Luke Mitchell), a skilled diver who is trying to figure out the secrets of Mako Island and who accidentally seems to unleash a powerful force which turns water against the mermaids. The girls must also deal with Zane, who attempts to exploit the moon pool after Rikki breaks up with him.

Compilation TV films

References 

General references

External links 
 Episode guide at the Internet Movie Database

Lists of Australian children's television series episodes
Lists of Australian drama television series episodes
Lists of fantasy television series episodes
2006 Australian television seasons
2007 Australian television seasons
2008 Australian television seasons
2009 Australian television seasons
2010 Australian television seasons